James Norman "Norm, Dutch" Gainor (April 10, 1904 – January 16, 1962) was a Canadian ice hockey professional forward. Gainor was most notable for playing on the Boston Bruins' 1928 "Dynamite Line" with Cooney Weiland and Dit Clapper, one of the earliest "named" forward lines in National Hockey League (NHL) history.

Gainor started his NHL career with the Boston Bruins, later playing for the Ottawa Senators, New York Rangers and Montreal Maroons. His career started in 1927 and he retired after 1935.  He was a member of two Stanley Cup-winning teams in his career, once with Boston in 1929 and again with the Maroons in 1935.

Gainor scored his first NHL goal on November 29, 1927.  It occurred in Boston's 4-0 victory over the Montreal Maroons.

Career statistics

Regular season and playoffs

External links
 

1904 births
1962 deaths
Boston Bruins players
Calgary Tigers players
Canadian ice hockey centres
Duluth Hornets players
Montreal Maroons players
New York Rangers players
Ottawa Senators (1917) players
Ottawa Senators (original) players
Portland Buckaroos players
Saskatoon Sheiks players
Ice hockey people from Calgary
Springfield Indians players
Stanley Cup champions